Dracaena spathulata is a species of flowering plant in the family Asparagaceae, native to South Africa (KwaZulu-Natal), Mozambique, Zimbabwe, and Tanzania. It was previously known under the synonym Sansevieria concinna.

Habitat
In the wild, Dracaena spathulata grows in sandy soils under the shade of coastal forests.

References

External links
 
 

spathulata
Flora of East Africa
Garden plants of Africa
House plants